Proteopedia is a wiki, 3D encyclopedia of proteins and other molecules.
The site contains a page for every entry in the Protein Data Bank (>130,000 pages), as well as pages that are more descriptive of protein structures in general such as acetylcholinesterase, hemoglobin, and the photosystem II with a Jmol view that highlights functional sites and ligands. It employs a scene-authoring tool so that users do not have to learn JSmol script language to create customized molecular scenes. Custom scenes are easily attached to "green links" in descriptive text that display those scenes in JSmol. A web browser is all that is needed to access the site and the 3D information; no viewers are required to be installed.

Proteopedia was the winner of the 2010 award for the best website by The Scientist magazine.

Legal aspects

Licensing terms
All user-added content is free and covered by the GNU Free Documentation License. Proteopedia is hosted at the Israel Structural Proteomics Center at the Weizmann Institute of Science.

See also 
 Protein structure

References

External links 
Proteopedia website

Biological databases
Creative Commons-licensed databases
Israeli online encyclopedias
MediaWiki websites
Encyclopedias of science